The  New York Giants season was the franchise's 4th season in the National Football League. The team finished a disappointing sixth with a 4-7-2 record after winning the NFL title in 1927. The Giants played two games against the Detroit Wolverines and failed to win either one (a 28-0 loss in Detroit and a 19-all tie at the Polo Grounds); at season's end, Giants owner Tim Mara bought the entire Detroit franchise (mostly to secure the services of star tailback Benny Friedman) and merged the two clubs under the Giants' name.

Schedule

Standings

See also
List of New York Giants seasons

External links
1928 New York Giants season at Pro Football Reference

New York Giants seasons
New York Giants
New York Giants
1920s in Manhattan
Washington Heights, Manhattan